Alsunga Municipality is a former municipality in the historical region of Courland in Latvia. The municipality was formed in 2009 from Alsunga Parish, the administrative centre being Alsunga. The municipality consists of the following villages and settlements: Alsunga, Almāle, Balande, Dienvidstacija, Ziedlejas, Bērzkalni, Būcmaņi, Grāveri, Reģi. As of 2020, the population was 1,268.

On 1 July 2021, Alsunga Municipality ceased to exist and its territory was merged into Kuldīga‎ Municipality.

See also 
 Administrative divisions of Latvia

References 

 
Former municipalities of Latvia